James Rollins Barker is a Canadian former diplomat. He was concurrently High Commissioner to Mauritius, Tanzania and Zambia. He was also Ambassador Extraordinary and Plenipotentiary to Somalia and Greece. He was also a soldier in World War II.

External links 
 Foreign Affairs and International Trade Canada Complete List of Posts 

High Commissioners of Canada to Mauritius
Year of birth missing (living people)
Living people
High Commissioners of Canada to Tanzania
High Commissioners of Canada to Zambia
Ambassadors of Canada to Somalia
Ambassadors of Canada to Greece